The Hosei Orange football program represents Hosei University in college football. They are members of the Top 8 in the Kantoh Collegiate American Football Association.

Name
In January 2017 the club's sponsor, Dome Corporation, announced that the name "Tomahawks" would be replaced by "Orange".

Tomahawks Field

With permission and assistance from Boise State University, Hosei is the first university in Japan to have a blue turf playing surface granted to them under the first international licensing of the playing surface through a Boise State trademark.

References

External links
 

American football in Japan
1935 establishments in Japan
American football teams established in 1935